"I Love You" is a hip hop song written by American rapper Vanilla Ice. Released as a single, it peaked at number 52 on the Billboard Hot 100 in 1990. It was also saw chart entries in the UK (number 45), Germany (number 65), and New Zealand, where it peaked at number 30.

Background
A departure from his usual style, "I Love You" is a ballad, and was released on Valentine's Day in 1991.  The song was described by AllMusic writer Steve Huey as "a lyrically simplistic, overemoted ballad".

Music video
A promotional video for the song, directed by Michael Bay, was produced by Mike Bodnarczuk.  The music video was featured in an episode of Beavis and Butt-head, where the duo make fun of Ice and pan the video.

Track listings
 CD Maxi – UK
 "I Love You" (Long Version) – 5:10
 "Stop That Train" – 4:30
 "Ice Ice Baby" – 4:30
 "I Love You" (Icetrumental) – 5:11

 Promo CD – U.S. (I Love You/Stop That Train)
 "I Love You" (Radio Mix)  – 4:19
 "Stop That Train" (Radio Mix) – 3:54
 "I Love You" (Single Edit)  – 3:46
 "Stop That Train" (Long Version) – 4:28
 "I Love You" (Long Version) – 5:10

Charts

References

1990 songs
1991 singles
Vanilla Ice songs
Contemporary R&B ballads
Music videos directed by Michael Bay
Songs written by Vanilla Ice
SBK Records singles